Ian Fang is a Chinese-born Singaporean actor, host, director and rapper.

Fang was named as one of the 8 Dukes of Caldecott Hill. He portrayed of a student who lost his grandmother and had to struggle for a living in 2013, in the drama Don't Stop Believin'. Through that debut role, he was awarded the Best Newcomer Award at the annual Star Awards Ceremony. Fang also starred in the drama On the Fringe 2011, the cast of the drama later also proceed on to shoot a movie Imperfect.

Career
Fang was born in Shanghai, China and moved to Singapore in 2002. He studied in Stamford Primary School, Bendemeer Secondary School and graduated from Republic Polytechnic. He made his acting debut in police drama C.L.I.F. in 2011, playing a rich kid who lands himself in trouble after single-handedly masterminding a series of bombings.

In 2012, Fang made his debut in film Imperfect. The same year, he also starred in Show Hand alongside Christopher Lee and Don't Stop Believin'.

In 2013, Fang was awarded the Best Newcomer award at Star Awards 2013. He also hosted his first travelogue My Working Holiday where he visited different countries to work in exchange for food and lodging, which earned him a nomination for the Best Info-Ed Host at Star Awards 20.

In 2014, Fang starred as a lead role in Channel U, Served H.O.T.. In the same year, he was given a role in basketball-themed movie Meeting The Giant, directed by Tay Ping Hui.

In 2016, Fang was nominated as the Best Supporting Actor in Star Awards 2016 as Chen Hao Wei in Tiger Mum which won Best Drama in 2016. He also made his debut as a rap artist and released his first single, "1st Attempt", featuring vocals from Sylvester Sim.

In 2017, Fang was nominated as the Best Supporting Actor in Star Awards as Lin Zi Jie in The Dream Job. He also release his second single "Still me" featuring Desmond Ng.

In 2018, Fang was nominated as the Best Supporting Actor in Star Awards as Shuai Ge in Till We Meet Again.

Fang has received 2 out of 10 Top 10 Most Popular Male Artistes from 2015, 2017 respectively.

Personal life
Fang is a Singapore Permanent Resident since 2015 and was raised by his mother Fang Pei Pei (divorced since 1993) and maternal grandmother after arriving to study in Singapore in 2002.

In 2019, a series of explicit text messages between actress Carrie Wong and Fang was leaked, suggesting a sexual affair between the two. The leaked texts also contained criticism towards fellow actor Lawrence Wong.

Filmography

Discography

Singles

Awards

References

External links
 on toggle.sg

Living people
People from Shanghai
Male actors from Shanghai
Singaporean male film actors
Singaporean male television actors
Singaporean people of Chinese descent
Year of birth missing (living people)